This is a list of installations operated by the United States Air Force located within the United States and abroad. Locations where the Air Force have a notable presence but do not operate the facility are also listed.

Background 
The location and number of US Air Force installations has fluctuated according to the size of the Air Force, the capabilities of available weapon systems, and the strategies contemplated for their employment. The number of active duty Air Force Bases within the United States rose from 115 in 1947 to peak at 162 in 1956 before declining to 69 in 2003 and 59 in 2020. This change reflects a Cold War expansion, retirement of much of the strategic bomber force, and the post–Cold War draw-down. Over time, the USAF has constantly realigned its forces within the network of bases to reflect current needs and strategies.

The Air Force use several terms to identify the different type of installations it operates:

 Air Force Base, Air Reserve Base or Air Guard Base are used to describe an installation from which aircraft operations can be conducted or from which major activities of importance to Air Force combat, combat support, or training missions can be supported.
 Air Force Station (sometimes Air Station), Air Reserve Station or Air National Guard Station is used to name installations, typically but not exclusively without a flying mission, that are operated by a unit of at least squadron size, that does not otherwise meet the criteria of being a base.
 Air Force Auxiliary Airfield is used if the installation has an aircraft operating area that provides operational activities in support of a primary installation and depends upon a primary installation for administrative and logistical support.
 Air Force Plant is used if the installation is Air Force controlled industrial property operated by a contractor. Air Force Plants are numbered rather than named.
 Air Base is typically but not always used to name an installation located outside the United States or its territories.

Active duty Installations are normally named after notable Air Force personnel, whereas Air Force Reserve and Air National Guard installations are either named in the same manner or after the community in which they are located.

United States 
Installations and locations in the contiguous United States. For Alaska and Hawaii see Pacific, East Asia and South East Asia section.

Active Duty
Active-duty USAF bases in the United States are under the jurisdiction of the following Major Commands. There are 57 Active Bases across the country:

Air National Guard and Air Force Reserve
Air National Guard units are a reserve military force composed of state Air National Guard members or federally recognized units and report to the governor of their respective state, territory (Puerto Rico, Guam, Virgin Islands) or the commanding general of the District of Columbia National Guard. Each of the 54 Air National Guard organizations is supervised by the adjutant general of the state or territory,
Air Force Reserve units are aligned under Fourth Air Force, Tenth Air Force and Twenty-Second Air Force of the Air Force Reserve Command. The command has Fighter, Air Refueling and Airlift units, and is administratively responsible for all the Air Force's individual mobilization augmentees.

Overseas

Caribbean, Central America and South America 
US Air Force operations in the Caribbean, Central America and South America are overseen by the Twelfth Air Force (Air Forces Southern). It is part of Air Combat Command and head-quartered at Davis-Monthan AFB in Arizona. It is the air component to US Southern Command, providing security-cooperation and air & cyberspace capabilities throughout its area of responsibility.

Pacific, East Asia and South East Asia 
PACAF's primary mission is to provide U.S. Pacific Command integrated expeditionary Air Force capabilities to defend the Homeland, promote stability, dissuade/deter aggression, and swiftly defeat enemies. PACAF traces its roots to the activation of Far East Air Forces, 3 August 1944, at Brisbane, Queensland, Australia. It consisted of three numbered air forces—5th, 7th and 13th—which were supporting combat operations in the Pacific Theater of World War II.

Europe and Africa
United States Air Forces in Europe – Air Forces Africa (USAFE-AFAFRICA) is a major command of the US Air Force and a component command of both US European Command (USEUCOM) and US Africa Command (USAFRICOM). The USAFE-AFAFRICA area of responsibility covers Europe, parts of Asia and all of Africa with the exception of Egypt, to achieve US national and NATO objectives based on taskings by the two combatant commanders.

USAFE-AFAFRICA has seven main operating bases and 114 geographically separate units. Although Akrotiri is within the USAFE-AFAFRICA area of responsibility, the units there are under the control of other major commands.

Middle East, Central Asia and South Asia 

US Air Force operations in the Middle East, Central Asia and part of South Asia are overseen by US Air Forces Central Command (USAFCENT). It is part of Air Combat Command and head-quartered at Shaw AFB in South Carolina. It is the air component to US Central Command, with a mission to deliver air power for the security and stability of the region. The USAFCENT area of responsibility covers Afghanistan, Bahrain, Egypt, Iran, Iraq, Jordan, Kazakhstan, Kuwait, Kyrgyzstan, Lebanon, Oman, Pakistan, Qatar, Saudi Arabia, Syria, Tajikistan, Turkmenistan, United Arab Emirates, Uzbekistan, and Yemen.

Throughout the 2010s, USAFCENT has supported the military intervention against the Islamic State of Iraq and Syria (Operation Inherent Resolve) and the NATO-led train, advise and assist mission in Afghanistan (Operation Resolute Support).

See also

List of United States Space Force installations
List of former United States Army installations
List of United States Marine Corps installations
List of United States Navy installations
List of United States Coast Guard installations
List of United States military bases
Lists of military installations

References

External links

 
Installations
Air Force